USS LCT-777 was a Mark 6 Landing Craft Tank of the United States Navy during World War II.

History
Built in 1943 at Mount Vernon, Ohio, LCT-777 was delivered to the US Navy in January 1944. She was then assigned to LCT Flotilla Seventeen, LCT Group 50. As a result of the explosion, five sailors were killed, and another six were badly wounded. Four tanks were sunk with her. She was stricken from the Naval Register on 27 November 1944.

Decorations
LCT-777 received one battle star.

Combat Action Ribbon
American Campaign Medal
European-African-Middle Eastern Campaign Medal with star 
World War II Victory Medal

Citations

Ships of the United States Navy
Landing craft of the United States Navy
Maritime incidents in June 1944
Shipwrecks of France